East Lothian may refer to:-

East Lothian, a historic county and council area in Scotland
East Lothian (UK Parliament constituency)
East Lothian (Scottish Parliament constituency)

See also 
Berwick and East Lothian (UK Parliament constituency)